Tomasz Kaczor (born 4 August 1989) is a Polish sprint canoeist. At the 2012 Summer Olympics, he competed in the Men's C-2 1000 metres with Marcin Grzybowski.  At the 2016 Olympics, he competed in the C-1 200 m and the C-1 1000 m.

References

External links
 
 
 

Polish male canoeists
1989 births
Living people
Olympic canoeists of Poland
Canoeists at the 2012 Summer Olympics
Canoeists at the 2016 Summer Olympics
Sportspeople from Poznań
Canoeists at the 2015 European Games
Canoeists at the 2019 European Games
European Games medalists in canoeing
European Games gold medalists for Poland
ICF Canoe Sprint World Championships medalists in Canadian
Universiade medalists in canoeing
Universiade bronze medalists for Poland
Medalists at the 2013 Summer Universiade